Nikola Lazović (November 13, 1994) is a Serbian footballer who plays with Scarborough SC in the Canadian Soccer League.

Career 
Lazović played at the youth level with FK Sloboda Užice. In 2013, he played in the Zlatibor District League with FK Zlatibor Čajetina, and assisted securing promotion to the Drina Zone League in his debut season. In 2016, he assisted Zlatibor in securing promotion to the Serbian League West. He returned to his former club Sloboda Užice in 2018 to play in the Serbian First League. Throughout his tenure with Sloboda he played in 29 matches, and recorded two goals in the First League. After a season in the First League he played with FK Tutin.  

In 2020, he returned to play with Sloboda Užice for another season. In the summer of 2021, he played abroad in the Canadian Soccer League with Scarborough SC.

References  
 

Living people
1994 births
Association football midfielders
Serbian footballers
FK Sloboda Užice players
FK Zlatibor Čajetina players
FK Tutin players
Scarborough SC players
Serbian First League players
Serbian League players
Canadian Soccer League (1998–present) players
Sportspeople from Užice